Babacar Niang (born March 31, 1991 in Montbrison, France) is a French basketball player who played for French Pro A league club Le Mans during the 2009-2010 season.

References

French men's basketball players
1991 births
Living people
People from Montbrison, Loire
Sportspeople from Loire (department)
Championnat de France de baseball
MSB.FR - Portrait De Babacar Niang
L'Équipe - L'actualité du sport en continu.
Basket-ball - Pro B : Babacar Niang revient de très loin